The women's fighting 55 kg competition in ju-jitsu at the 2013 World Games took place on 30 July 2013 at the Evagelista Mora Coliseum in Cali, Colombia.

Results

Elimination round

Group A

Group B

Finals
{{#invoke:RoundN|N4
|widescore=yes|bold_winner=high|team-width=260
|RD1=Semifinals
|3rdplace=yes

||{{flagIOC2athlete|Mandy Sonnemann|GER|2013 World Games}}|12||5
||{{flagIOC2athlete|Martyna Bierońska|POL|2013 World Games}}|7||2

||{{flagIOC2athlete|Mandy Sonnemann|GER|2013 World Games}}|8||3

|||7|

References

Ju-jitsu at the 2013 World Games